Rosetown—Biggar was a federal electoral district in Saskatchewan, Canada, that was represented in the House of Commons of Canada from 1935 to 1968.

This riding was created in 1933 from parts of Kindersley and Rosetown ridings.

It was abolished in 1966 when it was redistributed into Battleford—Kindersley, Moose Jaw, Regina—Lake Centre, Saskatoon—Biggar and Swift Current—Maple Creek ridings.

Election results

See also 

 List of Canadian federal electoral districts
 Past Canadian electoral districts

External links 

Former federal electoral districts of Saskatchewan
Biggar, Saskatchewan
Rosetown